The Castle of Arnedo is a fortification located in Arnedo in the autonomous community of La Rioja, Spain. It overlooks the city and the course of the Cidacos River. The first defensive structures built on the hill, where the castle is located now, date from ancient Roman times. After the Muslim invasion, the conquerors built a new defensive fortress—dated to the 9th century—over the existing remains. It was the most important castle in the region during the Middle Ages, and it changed hands between Muslims and Christians several times during the Reconquista.

References

Bibliography 
 
 
 

Castles in La Rioja